Chinna Waltair is a coastal neighborhood in Visakhapatnam in the Indian state of Andhra Pradesh, 5km away from the city's central neighborhood, Dwaraka Nagar. The area is governed by the Greater Visakhapatnam Municipal Corporation. The neighborhood offers tourist attractions along the Beach Road highway, including the Visakha Museum of historical artifacts from the Uttarandhra region and the Victory at Sea Memorial dedicated to the Indian Navy.

Transport
APSRTC routes

References

Neighbourhoods in Visakhapatnam